Emode may refer to:
 Early Modern English, abbreviated EModE
 Emode, a locality associated with the Komedes as known in Antiquity
 Emode, a computer architecture used by the Burroughs large systems
 Emode.com, a media company

See also 
 Imode (disambiguation)